Wat Pha Tak Suea is a Buddhist temple in Pha Tang, Nong Khai province, Thailand. The temple, which is built on top of a large hill, is notable for its 16-meter glass sky-walk which provides views of the nearby Mekong river.

References 

Buddhist temples in Nong Khai Province
Tourist attractions in Nong Khai province